The Tasmanian Government Railways R class was a class of 4-6-2 steam locomotives operated by the Tasmanian Government Railways.

History
In 1923, the Tasmanian Government Railways took delivery of four 4-6-2 locomotives from Perry Engineering, Gawler as replacements for the A class. They operated on the Western, Derwent Valley, Main and Fingal lines.

In the late 1930s, R3 and R4 were fitted with streamlining similar to the Victorian Railways S class for operation of Hobart to Launceston expresses. This was removed in the late 1940s. All were withdrawn in 1956-1957 due to a reorganisation of timetable to allow better use of the X Class diesels, much newer M class steam engines and DP 'diesel patrol' railcars.

After a period in storage in Launceston yard, due to their worn out condition and redundancy all was scrapped by the early 1960s, sadly just missing out on preservation.

References

External links
Tasmanian Government Railways Locomotive diagram L14 https://stors.tas.gov.au/P2316-1-23$init=P2316-1-23_033

Railway locomotives introduced in 1923
Steam locomotives of Tasmania
3 ft 6 in gauge locomotives of Australia
4-6-2 locomotives